Hriday Lani is a noted Indian script and dialogues writer. He is the winner of Filmfare Award for Best Dialogue for the 1999 film Sarfarosh along with Pathik Vats.

Career
Lani has written script and dialogues for various Hindi films. He has written dialogues for commercially successful films like Agni Sakshi (1996), Yeshwant (1997), Yugpurush (1998), Sarfarosh (1999).  He has also written for parallel cinemas like Gaman (1978), Mirch Masala (1987),  Salim Langde Pe Mat Ro (1989) and Salaam Bombay! (1988).

He shared the Filmfare Award for Best Dialogue with Pathik Vats for his work in Sarfarosh (1999) at the 45th Filmfare Awards.

He is a visiting faculty at the Institute of Moving Images, Pune.

References

External links
 

Indian male dramatists and playwrights
Living people
Filmfare Awards winners
Indian male screenwriters
Year of birth missing (living people)